= 1963 Saga gubernatorial election =

Election for Governor of Saga Prefecture

← 1959	17 April 1963	1967 →
Nominee	Sunao Ikeda
Party	Independent
Popular vote	Uncontested
Governor before election
Sunao Ikeda
Independent
Elected Governor
Sunao Ikeda
Independent

A gubernatorial election was held on 17 April 1963 to elect the Governor of Saga Prefecture. Incumbent Sunao Ikeda won the election uncontested.

== Candidates ==
- Sunao Ikeda - incumbent Governor of Saga Prefecture, age 61

== Results ==
Saga Gubernational Election 1963
Party	Candidate	Votes	%	±%
Independent	Sunao Ikeda (incumbent)			
